The following are the football (soccer) events of the year 1907 throughout the world.

Events

Winners club national championship 
England: For fuller coverage, see 1906-07 in English football.
Football League First Division – Newcastle United
Football League Second Division – Nottingham Forest
English FA Cup – Sheffield Wednesday
 Italy: A.C. Milan
 Greece: Ethnikos G.S. Athens
 Paraguay: Club Guaraní
Scotland: For fuller coverage, see 1906–07 in Scottish football.
Scottish Division One – Celtic
Scottish Division Two – St Bernard's
Scottish Cup – Celtic

International tournaments
1907 British Home Championship (March 16 – April 6, 1907)

Clubs founded
Atalanta
Como
Venezia
HJK Helsinki
Rot-Weiss Essen
FC Augsburg
SSV Jahn Regensburg
SC Paderborn

Births
January 4 – Willy Busch, German footballer (died 1982)
November 21 – Ernesto Mascheroni, Uruguayan footballer (died 1984)
December 6 – Giovanni Ferrari, Italian footballer (died 1982)
December 10 – Lucien Laurent, French footballer (died 2005)

Deaths 

 February 26 – C. W. Alcock, English centre forward and creator of the FA Cup. Organisator of the England v Scotland representative football matches (1870–72). (64)

References